This is a list of the first five seasons of what is now the Tulsa Golden Hurricane football program.

1895

Overview
1895 was the first year Henry Kendall College sponsored football. Only one game was played, a contest against the cross-town .

Schedule

1896

Schedule

1897

Schedule

1898

Schedule

1899

Schedule

References

1895